The New Jersey State House is located in Trenton and is the capitol building for the U.S. state of New Jersey.  Built in 1792, it is the third-oldest state house in continuous legislative use in the United States; only the Maryland State Capitol in  Annapolis and the Virginia State Capitol in Richmond are older. The building houses both chambers of the Legislature (the Senate and the General Assembly), as well as offices for the Governor, Lieutenant Governor and several state government departments. The building is the closest capitol building to a state border of any state capitol: the south front of the building overlooks the Delaware River with a view to neighboring Morrisville, Pennsylvania, and a bridge to Pennsylvania is within walking distance a few blocks away. The building also sits nearly exactly on a straight line between Center City, Philadelphia and Downtown Manhattan.

History
After the Legislature relocated to Trenton from Perth Amboy in 1790, it purchased land for £250 and 5 shillings.  Construction on the new state house, designed by Philadelphia-based architect Jonathan Doane, began in 1792.  The Doane building was covered in stucco, measured  and housed the Senate and House chambers in opposite wings. To meet the demands of the growing state, the structure was expanded several times during the 19th century, by noted architects such as John Notman of Philadelphia who created office wing on north side in 1845 and Samuel Sloan, also of Philadelphia who designed new wings to house both legislative chambers in 1871. On March 21, 1885, a large fire destroyed the State Street wing. Lewis Broome, of Jersey City led the reconstruction of the building. He used a rare pigmented brick from the Lippincott Brick Co. of Farmingdale. The brick used was a one-of-a-kind color for the region.

Merchantville architect Arnold Moses reconstructed the Senate wing in the American Renaissance style.

The New Jersey State House attained its current size in 1911 when a four-story office block replaced the original 1792 structure.  The only major change since has been modernization of the main corridor in 1950.  A 1960 plan, called for the replacement of the oldest sections of the structure with modern legislative chambers, however it was never implemented.

Renovation

A lengthy renovation and restoration project began in 1987. The project encompassed the legislative section of the building, an upgrade of mechanical and electrical systems, and the construction of the South Addition (office space). A $300M restoration of the entire building, which was in a state of disrepair, began in 2017.

Design
The New Jersey State House is unusual among state capitol buildings in the United States, the majority of which are reminiscent of the U.S. Capitol.  The building consists of two parallel structures connected by the dome-capped rotunda, resembling the letter H, with its long arm parallel to State Street.  A long portico wing, added by Notman and subsequently enlarged, extends west from the rotunda toward the Delaware River.  To this portico, a number of architecturally dissimilar, unusually-shaped structures have been added.  These structures have been the subject of subsequent renovations to blend them with the original wing.  The State House is set not on a park-like campus, as are many state houses, rather it is integrated into an urban setting along historic State Street and is surrounded by other legislative buildings.  The most scenic view of the building is from the west, near the Delaware River, and is the side dominated by the various additions.  Viewed from State Street, the dome is scarcely visible and there is little sense of the scale or design of the building.  The Governor's office occupies the remaining portion of the original 1792 State House.
       

Tours are offered daily Monday through Saturday, except state holidays.  The tours typically include the Senate and Assembly chambers galleries, party conference rooms, the rotunda and Governor's Office reception room. Middle and high school teachers can receive a grant from the Eagleton Institute to cover the cost of transportation for field trips to take tours of the New Jersey State House.

See also

List of the oldest buildings in New Jersey
List of state and territorial capitols in the United States

References

External links

History of State Capitol
NJ Legislature - Welcome to the State House 
State House Virtual Tour 

State House
State House
State capitols in the United States
Government buildings with domes
Museums in Trenton, New Jersey
History museums in New Jersey
Buildings and structures in Trenton, New Jersey
Tourist attractions in Trenton, New Jersey